Phil "Jiu-Jitsu Matrix" Migliarese (born Philip Migliarese III, January 11, 1976) is a 6th degree Relson Gracie Brazilian jiu-jitsu Black Belt with over 20 years of experience in BJJ and Mixed Martial Arts. A Gracie Worlds and National Champion, Migliarese is a trainer, training partner and coach to UFC and MMA fighters as well as World and Pan-Am Champions. Migliarese is also a master-level yoga instructor, author/creator of Yoga For Fighters and has many years of training in judo. He is the founder of Jiu-Jitsu Share Online Community , Jiu-JitsuMatrix  (a video newsletter and online learning community) and one of the co-founders/co-owners of Matrix Fights Promotion Company .  He currently lives in Philadelphia, Pennsylvania, where he teaches at Balance Studios  which he co-owns with his brother, Ricardo Migliarese. Migliarese is the head of Team Balance International.

Early life
Migliarese began his martial arts journey in 1988 at Maxercise in Philadelphia, Pennsylvania, with Steve Maxwell when he was 12 years old. Maxercise had affiliations with both Royce Gracie's Academy in Los Angeles, California, and Relson Gracie's Academy in Hawaii. Three months after he started training, Migliarese met Rorion Gracie and Royce Gracie at a seminar and shortly thereafter, he was introduced to Relson Gracie. Migliarese was quickly taken in by the Gracie family as he showed great promise in the sport. It was Relson though, that focused his attention on Migliarese's training and became his mentor and inspiration.

Car accident
In January 1993, Migliarese was in a devastating car accident that initially put him in a coma. He suffered injuries including broken nose, shoulder, collarbone, all of the ribs on the right side of his body, all of the fingers on his right hand and his pelvis as well as damage to his internal organs. This accident, which made him nearly immobile for 6 months,  changed the direction of his training and approach to Jiu-Jitsu forever. He credits his yoga breathing and practice for his recovery. Originally not expected to walk or train again, Migliarese was doing some light training and in attendance to support Royce at UFC 1 in November 1993. Given a clean bill of health in early 1994, he was back on the mat as one of Royce's training partners for UFC 2 in Denver, Colorado.

Brazilian jiu-jitsu training
He spent much of the 1990s at the Gracie Academy, learning the Gracie method of teacher training directly from Grand Master Helio Gracie or training with Relson in Hawaii. Migliarese returned to Philadelphia in 2000 to take over as head instructor of Relson's affiliate school. As a brown belt in 2001, Migliarese won the Gracie World Championship and was 2nd in the open division. In 2002, Migliarese and Rick opened Balance Studios, the only Relson Gracie affiliate in Philadelphia. That year at the Arnolds Classic/Gracie Worlds Migliarese won what would be his most well known match against UFC fighter Renato “Babalu” Sobral. In March 2003, at the Gracie Worlds in Columbus, Ohio, he became the youngest person to receive the honor of black belt from Relson Gracie and was among the first Americans to receive this promotion.

Yoga practice
Migliarese also spent a great deal of time studying and practicing his other passion, Ashtanga yoga. Introduced to yoga at the grade school level, Migliarese immediately took to the ancient system of breathing and postures and continued his practice regularly. In 1997, he traveled to Mysore, India to study with Sri K. Pattabhi Jois and asked for permission to teach Series I and II, which was the custom of the time, prior to current certifications. During this time, Migliarese not only practiced the Yoga himself, but watched and studied the methods that the Guru used in adjusting others to aide in their practice. Migliarese teaches Ashtanga Yoga in class and private lessons and utilizes some of the postures in a specific order for his Yoga For Fighters DVD .

MMA trainer
Migliarese and Rick have trained professional athletes and MMA fighters, including Philadelphia Eagles Trey Thomas and Winston Justice, UFC fighters Frankie Edgar and Waylon Lowe, Bellator fighter Tim Carpenter, several World and Pan-Am Jiu-Jitsu winners as well as local police officers and FBI agents. Migliarese was in the corner of UFC fighter Waylon Lowe on January 22, 2011, at UFC: Fight for the Troops 2.

References

External links 
 http://www.jiujitsushare.com
 http://www.jiujitsumatrix.com
 http://matrixfights.com
 http://www.balancestudios.net
 http://www.YogaForFighters.com

Living people
American practitioners of Brazilian jiu-jitsu
1976 births